Pentti Saarman (28 July 1941 – 23 June 2021) was a Finnish boxer. He competed in the men's light welterweight event at the 1972 Summer Olympics.

References

External links
 

1941 births
2021 deaths
Finnish male boxers
Olympic boxers of Finland
Boxers at the 1972 Summer Olympics
People from Hämeenlinna
Light-welterweight boxers
Sportspeople from Kanta-Häme